Maj. Gen. William S. Harney Summer Home, also known as the Harney Mansion, is a historic home located at Sullivan, Crawford County, Missouri. It was built in 1856, and is a 1 3/4-story, eclectic dwelling constructed of native brown sandstone.  The house has a rear wing added between 1869 and 1872. It was the summer home of William S. Harney, who purchased it in 1869. It is operated as a historic house museum.

It was listed on the National Register of Historic Places in 1984.

References

External links
"Foundation Makes Plans to Restore Sullivan's Treasure n Harney Mansion Was Built in 1856", eMissourian.com, August 2005

Houses on the National Register of Historic Places in Missouri
Historic house museums in Missouri
Houses completed in 1856
Buildings and structures in Crawford County, Missouri
National Register of Historic Places in Crawford County, Missouri